Charles William Sweeney (December 27, 1919 – July 16, 2004) was an officer in the United States Army Air Forces during World War II and the pilot who flew Bockscar carrying the Fat Man atomic bomb to the Japanese city of Nagasaki on August 9, 1945. Separating from active duty at the end of World War II, he later became an officer in the Massachusetts Air National Guard as the Army Air Forces transitioned to an independent United States Air Force, eventually rising to the rank of major general.

Military career

509th Composite Group
Sweeney became an instructor in the atomic missions training project, Project Alberta, at Wendover Army Airfield, Utah. Selected to be part of the 509th Composite Group commanded by Colonel Paul Tibbets, he was named commander of the 320th Troop Carrier Squadron on 6 January 1945. Initially his squadron used C-47 Skytrain and C-46 Commando transports on hand to conduct the top secret operations to supply the 509th, but in April 1945 it acquired five C-54 Skymasters, which had the range to deliver personnel and materiel to the western Pacific area.

On May 4, 1945, Sweeney became commander of the 393d Bombardment Squadron, Heavy, the combat element of the 509th, in charge of 15 Silverplate B-29s and their flight and ground crews, 535 men in all. In June and July Sweeney moved his unit to North Field on the island of Tinian in the Marianas.

In addition to supervising the intensive training of his flight crews during July 1945, Sweeney was slated to command the second atomic bomb mission. He trained with the crew of Captain (Charles D.) Don Albury aboard their B-29 The Great Artiste, and was aircraft commander on the training mission of July 11. He and the crew flew five of the nine rehearsal test drops of inert Little Boy and Fat Man bomb assemblies in preparation for the missions.

On 6 August 1945, Sweeney and Albury piloted The Great Artiste as the instrumentation and observation support aircraft for the atomic bomb attack on Hiroshima.

Bombing of Nagasaki

On 9 August 1945, Major Sweeney commanded Bockscar, which carried the atomic bomb Fat Man from the island of Tinian to Nagasaki. In addition to Bockscar, the mission included two observation and instrumentation support B-29s, The Great Artiste and The Big Stink, which would rendezvous with Bockscar over Yakushima Island. At the mission pre-briefing, the three planes were ordered to make their rendezvous over Yakushima at  due to weather conditions over Iwo Jima (the Hiroshima mission rendezvous).

Before takeoff, Tibbets warned Sweeney that he had lost at least 45 minutes of flying time because of the fuel pump problem, and to take no more than fifteen minutes at the rendezvous before proceeding directly to the primary target.

After takeoff from Tinian, Bockscar reached its rendezvous point and after circling for an extended period, found The Great Artiste, but not The Big Stink.  Climbing to 30,000 feet, the assigned rendezvous altitude, both aircraft slowly circled Yakushima Island. Though Sweeney had been ordered not to wait at the rendezvous for the other aircraft longer than fifteen minutes before proceeding to the primary target, Sweeney continued to wait for The Big Stink, perhaps at the urging of Commander Frederick Ashworth, the plane's weaponeer. After exceeding the original rendezvous time limit by a half-hour, Bockscar, accompanied by The Great Artiste, proceeded to the primary target, Kokura. No fewer than three bomb runs were made, but the delay at the rendezvous had resulted in 7/10ths cloud cover over the primary target, and the bombardier was unable to drop. By the time of the third bomb run, Japanese antiaircraft fire was getting close, and Japanese fighter planes could be seen climbing to intercept Bockscar.

Poor bombing visibility and an increasingly critical fuel shortage eventually forced Bockscar to divert from Kokura and attack the secondary target, Nagasaki. As they approached Nagasaki, the heart of the city's downtown was covered by dense cloud, and Sweeney and Ashworth, initially decided to bomb Nagasaki using radar. However, a small opening in the clouds allowed Bockscar's bombardier to verify the target as Nagasaki. As the crew had been ordered to drop the bomb visually if possible, Sweeney decided to proceed with a visual bomb run. Bockscar then dropped Fat Man, with a blast yield equivalent to 21 kilotons of TNT. The failure to drop Fat Man at the precise bomb aim point caused the atomic blast to be confined to the Urakami Valley. As a consequence, a major portion of the city was protected by the intervening hills, and only 60% of Nagasaki was destroyed. The bombing also severed the Mitsubishi arms production extensively and killed an estimated 35,000–40,000 people outright, including 23,200–28,200 Japanese industrial workers, 2,000 Korean slave laborers, and 150 Japanese soldiers.

Low on fuel, Bockscar barely made it to the runway on Okinawa. With only enough fuel for one landing attempt, Sweeney brought Bockscar in fast and hard, ordering every available distress flare on board to be fired as he did so. The number two engine died from fuel starvation as Bockscar began its final approach. Touching the runway hard, the heavy B-29 slewed left and towards a row of parked B-24 bombers before the pilots managed to regain control.  With both pilots standing on the brakes, Sweeney made a swerving 90-degree turn at the end of the runway to avoid going over the cliff into the ocean. 2nd Lt. Jacob Beser recalled that at this point, two engines had died from fuel exhaustion, while "the centrifugal force resulting from the turn was almost enough to put us through the side of the airplane."

After Bockscar returned to Tinian, Tibbets recorded that he was faced with the dilemma of considering “if any action should be taken against the airplane commander, Charles Sweeney, for failure to command.”  After meeting on Guam with Tibbets and Sweeney, General Curtis LeMay, chief of staff for the Strategic Air Forces, confronted Sweeney, stating, "You fucked up, didn't you, Chuck?", to which Sweeney made no reply.  LeMay then turned to Tibbets and told him that an investigation into Sweeney's conduct of the mission would serve no useful purpose.

In November 1945, Sweeney returned with the 509th Composite Group to Roswell Army Air Base in New Mexico to train aircrews for the atomic testing mission, Operation Crossroads.

Post-war activities

Sweeney left active duty with the rank of lieutenant colonel on June 28, 1946, but remained active with the Massachusetts Air National Guard. Later promoted to full colonel, on February 21, 1956, Sweeney was named commander of its 102nd Air Defense Wing and shortly after, on April 6, was promoted to brigadier general. During this time, he was activated with the 102nd and served in Europe during the Berlin Crisis from October 1961 to August 1962. Sweeney was made chief of staff in October 1967.

In the 1960s, Sweeney coordinated civil defense in Boston, serving as the Boston Director of Civil Defense.

He retired in 1976 as a major general in the Air National Guard.  He also appeared in the 1970s television series The World at War and was seen explaining the USAAF buildup to the mission raids.

Throughout his life Sweeney remained convinced of the appropriateness and necessity of the bombing. "I saw these beautiful young men who were being slaughtered by an evil, evil military force," he said in 1995. "There's no question in my mind that President Truman made the right decision." At the same time, he said, "As the man who commanded the last atomic mission, I pray that I retain that singular distinction."

Later life

Near the end of his life, Sweeney wrote a controversial and factually disputed memoir of the atomic bombing and the 509th Composite Group, War's End: An Eyewitness Account of America's Last Atomic Mission. In War's End, Sweeney defended the decision to drop the atomic bomb in light of subsequent historical questioning. However, it was Sweeney's other assertions regarding the Nagasaki atomic mission, along with various anecdotes regarding the 509th and its crews that drew the most criticism. Tibbets, Major "Dutch" Van Kirk, Colonel Thomas Ferebee and others vigorously disputed Sweeney's account of events.  Partly in response to War's End, Tibbets issued a revised version of his own autobiography in 1998, adding a new section on the Nagasaki attack in which he harshly criticized Sweeney's actions during the mission.

In his later years Sweeney performed in various air shows doing many maneuvers to awe crowds. Sweeney died at age 84 on July 16, 2004, at Massachusetts General Hospital in Boston.

A short documentary featuring an audio recording of Sweeney describing the Nagasaki mission preparation and execution called "Nagasaki: The Commander's Voice" was made in 2005. The 2002 audio recording was the last one made before his death.

Awards

See also

 Paul Tibbets, Sweeney's counterpart on the mission which dropped Little Boy on Hiroshima

References

Bibliography
 Brooks, Lester. Behind Japan's Surrender: Secret Struggle That Ended an Empire. New York: McGraw-Hill Book Company, 1968. 
 Grayling, A.C. Among the Dead Cities. London: Bloomsbury, 2006. .
 Miller, Merle and Abe Spitzer. We Dropped the A-Bomb. New York: Thomas Y. Crowell Company, 1946.
 Olivi, Lt.Col. USAF (Ret) Fred J. Decision At Nagasaki: The Mission That Almost Failed. Privately Printed, 1999. .
 Sweeney, Maj.Gen. USAF (Ret) Charles, with James A. Antonucci and Marion K. Antonucci. War's End: an Eyewitness Account of America's Last Atomic Mission. New York: Avon Books, 1997. .
 Tomatsu, Shomei. 11:02 Nagasaki. Tokyo: Shashin Dojinsha, 1966.

External links

 Annotated bibliography for Charles Sweeney from the Alsos Digital Library for Nuclear Issues
 
 Reflections from above: an American pilot's perspective on the mission which dropped the atomic bomb on Nagasaki
 Eyewitness account of atomic bombing over Nagasaki, by William Laurence, New York Times
 .
 

1919 births
2004 deaths
Recipients of the Air Medal
United States Air Force generals
People from Quincy, Massachusetts
People associated with the atomic bombings of Hiroshima and Nagasaki
United States Army Air Forces bomber pilots of World War II
People from Lowell, Massachusetts
Recipients of the Silver Star
North Quincy High School alumni
Massachusetts National Guard personnel
Burials at Massachusetts National Cemetery